Kinetic 9 or Beretta 9 (born Samuel Craig Murray) is a member of the hip-hop group Killarmy, a group affiliated with The Wu-Tang Clan. He is also a member of the group Achozen alongside Shavo Odadjian and The RZA.
Killarmy went on to record three  albums: Silent Weapons for Quiet Wars (1997), Dirty Weaponry (1999), and Fear, Love & War (2001)

Kinetic 9 appeared on the track "Ratiug" from John Frusciante's 2012 album PBX Funicular Intaglio Zone  as well as the tracks "FM" and "909 Day" from the album Letur-Lefr. He has also appeared on tracks with artists such as Craig G, RBX, Black Knights, Reef the Lost Cauze, Mr. Bill, Scienz of Life, Block McCloud, True Kash, GrandmaMoses, Bizz and Cryptik Soul.

Discography

Videography

References

External links 
 RZA, Odadjian, Kinetic 9, Burke join forces

Year of birth missing (living people)
Living people
Rappers from New York City
African-American rappers
Wu-Tang Clan affiliates
Killarmy members
21st-century American rappers